The Mysterious Press is an American publishing company specializing in mystery fiction based in New York City. The company, founded in 1975 by Otto Penzler, has been associated with various publishing companies over the years, most recently with Grove Atlantic, where it was an imprint from 2011 to 2019. As of January 1, 2020, it became a totally independent imprint as part of Penzler Publishers, which also features three additional imprints: MysteriousPress.com, Scarlet, and American Mystery Classics. The offices of the Mysterious Press are located within The Mysterious Bookshop in the TriBeCa neighborhood.

History
Mysterious Press was founded in 1975 by Otto Penzler, and was one of the first genre publishers to use high-quality materials like acid-free paper, full-cloth bindings, and full-color dust jackets, uncommon in a time when such books were often printed as cheaply as possible. Many of the books it published were done in both trade and limited editions. In 1989, the company was sold to Warner Books, which was then bought by Hachette in 2005. Penzler, who had since created a new imprint, Otto Penzler Books, at Carroll & Graf Publishers (later moved to Houghton Mifflin Harcourt), re-acquired the Mysterious Press name in 2011 and it became an imprint at Grove/Atlantic, Inc., though without publication rights to any of the previous imprint's back titles. In 2020, Mysterious Press became fully independent as part of Penzler Publishers, distributed by W.W. Norton & Company. Mysterious Press has also partnered with Open Road Integrated Media since 2011 for ebooks.

In its earliest days, Mysterious Press published works by Cornell Woolrich, Ross Macdonald, and Isaac Asimov. It went on to publish Maxwell Grant, James Ellroy, Patricia Highsmith, Ruth Rendell, Donald E. Westlake, Kingsley Amis, and Eric Ambler, among many others. It currently publishes books by Thomas Perry, Joyce Carol Oates, Andrew Klavan, Lyndsay Faye, Stephen Hunter, Ken Bruen, and others.

References

External links
Mysteriouspress.com 
Archives and Publications of Mysterious Press The Ohio State University Libraries Rare Books and Manuscripts Collection

Book publishing companies based in New York (state)
Publishing companies established in 1975
1975 establishments in New York City
Tribeca
American companies established in 1975